Flintshire, also known as the County of Flint, is one of Wales' thirteen historic counties, and a former administrative county (and a vice-county). It mostly lies on the north-east coast of Wales.

Flintshire is notable as having one of the few large county exclaves (an area known as "English Maelor" or "Maelor Saesneg") to survive the Counties (Detached Parts) Act 1844.

The administrative county of Flint was abolished under the Local Government Act 1972 on 1 April 1974, becoming part of the new administrative area of Clwyd. The exclaves became part of Wrexham Maelor district – other parts formed the districts of Alyn and Deeside, Delyn and Rhuddlan.  A unitary authority, also named Flintshire, was formed in 1996 under the Local Government (Wales) Act 1994, consisting only of the Alyn and Deeside and Delyn districts – the Wrexham Maelor parts now form part of Wrexham County Borough, with the former Rhuddlan district forming the northernmost part of the current Denbighshire unitary authority.

Geography
The historic county does not have the same boundaries as the current administrative Flintshire; in particular it includes a large exclave called Maelor Saesneg; it also includes Prestatyn, Rhyl and St Asaph which are now administered as part of Denbighshire, as well as Bangor-on-Dee and Overton-on-Dee, which are administered as part of Wrexham. Other exclaves of the historic Flintshire include the manors of Marford and Hoseley, Abenbury Fechan and Bryn Estyn, all on the outskirts of Wrexham, and also a small part of the parish of Erbistock around the Boat Inn. These are all completely surrounded by the historic county of Denbighshire. Additionally, a small part of Flintshire, including the village of Sealand, is isolated across the River Dee when its course was changed to improve navigation.

Flintshire is a maritime county bounded to the north by the Irish Sea, to the north-east by the Dee estuary, to the east by Cheshire and to the south and southwest by Denbighshire. The Maelor Saesneg is bounded on the north-west by Denbighshire, on the north-east by Cheshire, and on the south by Shropshire. A medium height range of hills, the Clwydian Range (part of the Clwydian Range and Dee Valley Area of Outstanding Natural Beauty) run in southeast-northwest direction along the border between the main part of Flintshire and Denbighshire, almost reaching the sea near Prestatyn. The Offa's Dyke Path runs along the crest of these hills. 

The highest point in the historic county (county top) is found within these hills at Moel Famau, height , a notable viewpoint topped by the ruined remains of the Jubilee Tower, built in 1810 to commemorate the golden jubilee of King George III.

Flintshire is the smallest historic county in Wales. The coast along the Dee estuary is heavily developed by industry and the north coast much developed for tourism. The Clwydian Mountains occupy much of the west of the county. The highest point is Moel Famau (1,820 feet / 554 metres). The chief towns are Buckley, Connah's Quay, Flint, Hawarden, Holywell, Mold, Queensferry, and Shotton. The main rivers are the Dee (the estuary of which forms much of the coast) and the Clwyd. The main industries are manufacturing of aircraft components (Airbus), engines (Toyota), paper (Shotton Paper), steel processing (Corus), agriculture and tourism.

Places of special interest include castles in Flint, Hawarden, Rhuddlan and Ewloe, Greenfield Valley, St. Winefride's Well in Holywell and Wepre Country Park, Connah's Quay.

Formation

The county was formed in 1284 under the terms of the Statute of Rhuddlan, following the defeat of the Principality of Wales. However, the region had been English since the 8th century, and formed part of Cheshire until it was captured by the Welsh in the late 12th century. In the 13th century, prior to its re-capture by the Normans, the region comprised:

 Tegeingl (Mercian Englefield), a Cantref in Gwynedd
 certain Commotes within the Cantref of Maelor, in Powys Fadog:
 Maelor Saesneg (i.e., Saxon Maelor)
 Yr Hob - i.e., Hopedale
 Ystrad Alyn

Yr Hob and Ystrad Alyn, which been part of Gwynedd earlier in the century, had become sufficiently Welsh that they were regarded as another part of Welsh Maelor, rather than distinguished from it like Maelor Saesneg. They were not initially included in Flintshire, but instead became Marcher Lordships. Yr Hob became the Lordship of Hope, while Ystrad Alyn was split in two - the Lordships of Mold and Hawarden. Following the Laws in Wales Act (1536), these three Lordships were merged into Flintshire.

County offices

Flintshire County Council established its base at the old County Hall in Chester Street in Mold. Additional facilities acquired included a local militia barracks (originally designed by Thomas Mainwaring Penson) which was converted for use as council offices in the late 1880s. After finding, in the 1930s, that the Chester Street facilities were too cramped, county leaders decided to procure modern facilities: the site they selected formed part of the Llwynegrin Hall estate which was acquired for the purpose. The new building, known as County Hall, Mold, was completed in October 1967.

See also
 Flintshire
 List of Lord Lieutenants of Flintshire
 List of Custodes Rotulorum of Flintshire
 List of High Sheriffs of Flintshire
 Flintshire (UK Parliament constituency)

References

External links
Map of Flintshire on Wikishire

 
Historic counties of Wales
States and territories established in 1284
History of Wrexham County Borough
History of Denbighshire